Heliconiini is a tribe of butterflies in the subfamily Heliconiinae, also known as the passion-vine butterflies. This group has roughly 100 species and subspecies distributed primarily in the Neotropics.

Genera and select species
Agraulis (Boisduval & Le Conte, 1833) monotypic
Agraulis vanillae (Linnaeus, 1758) – Gulf fritillary
Dione (Hübner, 1819)
Dione juno (Cramer, 1779) – Juno silverspot, Juno longwing
Dryadula (Michener, 1942) monotypic
Dryadula phaetusa (Linnaeus, 1758) – banded orange, orange tiger
Dryas (Hübner, 1807) monotypic
Dryas iulia (Hübner, 1807) – Julia longwing
Eueides (Hübner, 1816) – longwings
Heliconius (Kluk, 1802) – longwings or heliconians
Philaethria (Billberg, 1820)
Podotricha (Michener, 1942)

Two additional genera, Laparus Billberg, 1820 and Neruda Turner, 1976, have recently been synonymized with Heliconius.

See also
List of fritillaries (butterflies)

References

 

Taxa named by William John Swainson
Butterfly tribes